Sharon Blaney (born May 16, 1979 in Braintree, Massachusetts) is an American rugby union player. In 2008 Sharon played with the NRU when they won the NASC. She made her USA Eagles debut against  in 2009. She played at the 2010 Women's Rugby World Cup. Blaney was named in the squad to the 2014 Women's Rugby World Cup in France.

Sharon grew up playing soccer and softball, and won numerous awards as a track star in high school.

References

External links
 Eagles Player Profile

1979 births
Living people
United States women's international rugby union players
American female rugby union players
Female rugby union players
21st-century American women